The Rwanda Billie Jean King Cup team represents Rwanda in Billie Jean King Cup tennis competition and are governed by the Rwanda Tennis Federation.  They currently compete in the Europe/Africa Zone of Group III.

History
Rwanda competed in its first Billie Jean King Cup in 2021.  Their best result was finishing fourth in their Group III pool in 2021.

Team (2021)
Megane Ingabire
Olive Tuyisenge
Sonia Tuyishime
Joselyn Umulisa

See also
Billie Jean King Cup
Rwanda Davis Cup team

External links

Billie Jean King Cup teams
Billie Jean King Cup
Billie Jean King Cup